The Electric Park Pavilion is a pavilion located in Blackwell, Oklahoma, designed in 1912 by W.L. McAltee. The pavilion was built as a "salute to electricity" and features a 160-foot domed ceiling, and an 800-seat auditorium. The building was once lined with over 500 lights, on the dome, its 27 flag poles with American flags, and its 22 arched windows. The Mission/Spanish Revival style building is made of brick and stucco, and was dedicated on March 23, 1913.

It currently houses the Top of Oklahoma Historical Society Museum.

References

External links
 Top of Oklahoma Historical Society Museum - Facebook site
 Top of Oklahoma Historical Society Museum - information from Travel Oklahoma

Event venues on the National Register of Historic Places in Oklahoma
Mission Revival architecture in Oklahoma
Buildings and structures completed in 1912
Buildings and structures in Kay County, Oklahoma
History museums in Oklahoma
Rural electrification
1912 establishments in Oklahoma
National Register of Historic Places in Kay County, Oklahoma